Ryan Ellsworth (born 6 October 1975 in Kelowna, British Columbia) is a Canadian-born British actor.  A graduate of LAMDA, he made his professional stage debut in Declan Donnellan's production of Antigone at the Old Vic Theatre in 1999.

Other stage credits include The Round Dance at the Roundhouse, Where There's a Will for English Touring Theatre, Cat on a Hot Tin Roof at Theatr Clwyd, Henry V at Regent's Park Open Air Theatre and Labyrinth at Hampstead Theatre. In 2017–18, he played the title role in The Wizard of Oz at the Sheffield Crucible Theatre.

Ellsworth was a member of the Reduced Shakespeare Company touring the UK and Europe with The Complete Works of William Shakespeare (Abridged).

He has performed in Cheek by Jowl's productions of Cymbeline and Tis Pity She's a Whore. In 2022, Ellsworth was in the original London cast of Aaron Sorkin's adaptation of To Kill a Mockingbird at the Gielgud Theatre, directed by Bartlett Sher. His TV credits include Island at War for ITV and EastEnders for the BBC.

In 2020, Ellsworth appeared in the period crime drama The Alienist: Angel of Darkness for TNT. In 2022, Ellsworth appeared as Murray Sinclair, father of Enid Sinclair, in the Netflix comedy horror series, Wednesday.

References

1975 births
Living people
British male stage actors
British male television actors
People from Kelowna
Canadian emigrants to the United Kingdom
Alumni of the London Academy of Music and Dramatic Art
Male actors from British Columbia